K. chinensis may refer to:
 Kailidiscus chinensis, an extinct species of echinoderm which existed in what is now China during the Middle Cambrian period
 Kerria chinensis, a scale insect species in the genus Kerria

See also
 Chinensis (disambiguation)